Randeer Morr also known as Mandi Akbar Abad is a village in District Sialkot, in Central Punjab, Pakistan . It is located at an altitude of 220 metres. Residents are mostly farmers and public service sector employees. A good number are employed in middle east and Europe and send money for families back home.

Location Randeer Morr is 35 kilometers from Gujrat and 20 Kilometre from Sialkot. Sialkot motorway is 10km from the village

Castes and tribes
Major caste is Khokhar clan of Rajput and Jutt but other tribes such as Cheema,Rajput and Ghumman are also found here.

References

Populated places in Sialkot District